Gauruncus molinopampae is a species of moth of the family Tortricidae. It is found in Peru.

The wingspan is 18 mm. The forewings are brown with fine darker strigulation (fine streaks) from the apex to the end of the median cell and mid-termen. The remaining area is cream ferruginous with terminal brownish suffusion and some concolorous strigulae. The hindwings are brownish.

Etymology
The species name refers to the type locality.

References

Moths described in 2010
Euliini
Moths of South America
Taxa named by Józef Razowski